Rome State Airport  is a public use airport located 20 nautical miles (23 mi, 37 km) southwest of the central business district of Rome, in Malheur County, Oregon, United States. It is owned by the Oregon Department of Aviation.

History
The airport was built by the United States Army Air Forces about 1942, and was known as Rome Flight Strip.  It was an emergency landing airfield for military aircraft on training flights.    It was closed after World War II, and was turned over for local government use by the War Assets Administration (WAA).

Facilities and aircraft 
Rome State Airport covers an area of 147 acres (59 ha) at an elevation of 4,053 feet (1,235 m) above mean sea level. It has one runway designated 3/21 with a gravel surface measuring 6,000 by 150 feet (1,829 x 46 m). For the 12-month period ending May 13, 2009, the airport had 100 general aviation aircraft operations, an average of 8 per month.

References

External links 

 Aerial image as of June 1994 from USGS The National Map

Airports in Malheur County, Oregon
Flight Strips of the United States Army Air Forces
Airfields of the United States Army Air Forces in Oregon
1942 establishments in Oregon